American Embassy may refer to:

 Any of the embassies maintained by the US
 The American Embassy, a short-lived television show on the Fox network